Apertile is a genus of trematodes in the family Opecoelidae.

Species
Apertile holocentri (Manter, 1947) Overstreet, 1969
Apertile overstreeti Toman, 1992

References

Opecoelidae
Plagiorchiida genera